Ananteris nairae is a scorpion species found in Brazilian Amazonia. The species has the most western distribution of the species in Ananteris. The specific epithet refers to Nair Otaviano Aguiar.

References

Buthidae
Animals described in 2004
Scorpions of South America
Fauna of Brazil